The People's Political Party was a political party in Saint Vincent and the Grenadines. It was established in 1952 as a breakaway from the ruling Eighth Army of Liberation, and was the country's first lasting nationwide political party. It was the only party to contest the 1954 general elections and received three of the eight seats (the remaining seats were won by independents). In the 1957 elections it received almost half the national vote and won five of the eight seats. In 1961 it remained in power with six of the nine seats.

In the 1966 elections it received fewer votes than the Saint Vincent Labour Party, but won one seat more. However, in early elections the following year it was reduced to three seats. After both parties won six seats in the 1972 elections, early elections were held in 1974. Prior to the election several senior members of the party formed the Mitchell/Sylvester Faction. The PPP's opposition to independence from the United Kingdom saw it reduced to just two seats, whilst the Labour Party won ten. In the 1979 elections it failed to win a seat, and was dissolved in 1984.

Election results

House of Assembly elections

References 

Political parties in Saint Vincent and the Grenadines
Political parties established in 1952
Political parties disestablished in 1984
1952 establishments in the British Empire